The Scrittori d'Italia ("Authors of Italy") was an Italian book collection, published by Giuseppe Laterza & figli from 1910 to 1987 in Bari. The series was born with the intent to define and explain a cultural canon of the new Italy, disassociating from a culture yet considered too much based on the classic of the humanism, and choosing to represent also the civil history of the newborn Italian State. The original work plan included 660 volumes, of which 287 were actually published (including some second editions) for a total of 179 works.

History of publications 

The Scrittori d'Italia book collection was born in 1910 from an idea of the not yet thirty-years-old Giovanni Laterza, who wanted to develop family cartolier activity as a "publisher of works that really serve to improve culture in general" on the model of the Barbera publishing house, magnifying the original activity of stationery and bookshop of his family, and at the same time destroying what had been the tradition of literary historiography to that day.

The bold editorial choice by Laterza was to include, with the classics, also authors of lesser importance such as, for example, historiographers, politicians, philosophers or economists, and implementing what the Piedmontese philologist and linguist Gianfranco Folena defined an "assault with the power of non-poetry and also of non-literature and anti-literature to the classical fortress and the religion of Letters". To realize this literary project, Laterza hired a fundamental personality of the Italian cultural landscape – Benedetto Croce. Croce fixed the editorial guidelines that became typical of the book series: the lack of introduction and comment, and in addendum notes, indexes and any philological apparatus.

The book collection was announced on 10 March 1910 with a telegraphic communication by Giovanni Laterza to Benedetto Croce "Starting today the composition of the Italian Authors's series, I turn my thinking to you, that wanted it to be edited by me. I promise to honor my work within your great idea". The philosopher from the Abruzzo inaugurated the series by editing the first volume dedicated to Marinist poets. Croce was followed as editor by Achille Pellizzari, Fausto Nicolini, Santino Caramella, Luigi Russo, and by Gianfranco Folena.

Croce set the collection with the aim of creating an "archive of national culture" that could be representative of the Italian cultural landscape and of the historical, philosophical and social bases that had brought Italy to unity.
Only in the first four years, about fifty titles were published; the Marinist poets were followed by authors such as Matteo Bandello, Carlo Gozzi, and Teofilo Folengo.

Foresight, dedication and organizational rigor by Laterza and Croce offered to the Italian public, a few months later, editions of works such as the Military Science by Luigi Blanch and the poems of Iacopo Vittorelli.
The "second phase" of the editorial development of the book collection may be considered that between 1915 and 1925. The years of the First World War slowed editorial production, that regained his vigor only in the 1920s.

The advent of the Fascist Party and the murdering of Giacomo Matteotti in 1924 marked the beginning of what may be called the "third phase" that marked the life of the Scrittori d'Italia and of his publishing house.
If Croce between 1903 and 1914 had worked to fix and divulge, with the help of Giovanni Laterza, the canon of the culture of the new Italy and its texts, between 1925 and 1943 he fought to keep it and to integrate it.
The firm antifascist position of Giovanni Laterza came to fruition in editorial choices far from the ostentatious "virility" and the triumphalism of the regime. In fact, in the thirties and forties were published, for example, the Dialoghi d'Amore by the Jewish author Leone Ebreo (subsequently seized on 28 December 1939), the Poems by Giuseppe Parini and the History of the Tridentine Council.

The Italian Racial Laws in 1938 and the Pact of Steel in 1939 increased the regime control on the press. The Second World War and the death of Giovanni Laterza on 21 August 1943 marked the stop of publications for the next three years, that only restarted in 1947 with Andrea da Barberino and his book Reali di Francia.

Works published in the collection

1.
2.
2.
3.
4.
5.
5.
6.
6.
7.
8.
9.
9.
10.
11.
12.
13.
14.
15.
16.
17.
18.
19.
21.
22.
23.
24.
25.
26.
27.
28.
29.
29.
30.
31.
31.
32.
32.
33.
34.
34.
35.
36.
37.
38.
39.
39.
40.
41.
42.
43.
44.
45.
46.
47.
48.
49.
50.
51.
52.
53.
54.
55.
56.
57.
58.
59.
60.
61.
62.
63.
64.
65.
66.
67.
68.
69.
69.
70.
70.
71.
72.
73.
74.
75.
75; 78.
76.
77.
79.
80.
81.
82.
83.
83.
84.
85.
86.
87.
88.
88–89.
89.
90.
91.
92.
93.
94.
95.
96.
97.
97.
98.
98.
99.
100.
101.
102.
103.
104.
105.
106.
107.
108.
109.
110.
111.
112.
113.
114.
115.
116.
117.
118.
119.
120.
121.
122.
123.
124.
125.
126.
127.
128.
129.
130.
131.
132.
133.
134.
135.
136.
137.
138.
139.
140.
141.
142.
143.
144.
145.
146.
147.
148.
149.
150.
151.
152.
153.
154.
155.
156.
157.
158.
159.
160.
161.
162.
163.
164.
165.
166.
167.
168.
169.
170.
171.
172.
173.
174.
175.
176.
177.
178.
179.
180.
181.
182.
183.
184.
185.
186.
187.
188.
189.
190.
191.
192.
193.
194.
195.
196.
197.
198.
199.
200.
201.
202.
203.
204.
205.
206.
207.
208.
209.
210.
211.
212.
213.
214.
215.
216.
217.
218.
219.
220.
221.
222.
223.
224.
225.
226.
227.
228.
229.
230.
232.
233.
234.
235.
236.
237.
238.
239.
240.
241.
242.
243.
244.
245.
246.
247.
248.
249.
250.
251.
252.
253.
254.
255.
256.
257.
258.
259.
260.
261.
262.
263.
264.
265.
266.
267.
268.
269.
270.
271.
272.
273.

References

External links 

Italian literature
Series of books